Ambrosia chenopodiifolia is a species of ragweed known by the common names San Diego bursage and San Diego bur ragweed. It is native to the Mexican states of Baja California and Baja California Sur (Comondu Municipality), as well as to Orange and San Diego Counties it int US State of California. It is a member of the coastal sage scrub plant community.

Description
Ambrosia chenopodiifolia is a thickly branching shrub exceeding 3 meters in maximum height. The leaves are ovals up to 3 centimeters long and coated in white hairs. They are sometimes lobed.

Like other ragweeds it is monoecious, with each inflorescence bearing heads of pistillate (female) flowers below a cluster of staminate (male) flowers. The inflorescence is spiny, especially when in fruit. The fruit is a spherical, woolly bur about half a centimeter long covered in hooked spines.

References

External links

 Calflora Database:  Ambrosia chenopodiifolia (San diego bur sage,  San diego bursage)
Jepson Manual eFlora (TJM2) treatment of Ambrosia chenopodiifolia
Ambrosia chenopodiifolia UC Calphotos Photo gallery: Ambrosia chenopodiifolia

chenopodiifolia
Flora of California
Flora of Baja California
Flora of Baja California Sur
Natural history of the California chaparral and woodlands
Natural history of San Diego County, California
Plants described in 1844
Taxa named by George Bentham
Critically endangered flora of California